Novosphingobium barchaimii  is a bacterium from the genus Novosphingobium which has been isolated from soil which was contaminated with hexachlorocyclohexane from the Spolana Neratovice plant in the Czech Republic.

References

External links
Type strain of Novosphingobium barchaimii at BacDive -  the Bacterial Diversity Metadatabase	

Acidophiles
Bacteria described in 2013
Sphingomonadales